Karen-Sofie Styrmoe (20 October 1930 – 14 July 2001) was a Norwegian alpine skier. She was born in Tinn. She participated at the 1952 Winter Olympics in Oslo, where she competed in slalom and downhill.

References

External links

1930 births
2001 deaths
People from Tinn
Norwegian female alpine skiers
Olympic alpine skiers of Norway
Alpine skiers at the 1952 Winter Olympics
Sportspeople from Vestfold og Telemark